Pirkko Mannola (born 27 December 1938) is a Finnish actress and singer.

Career
Mannola has appeared in more than 50 films and television shows since 1959. She starred in the film Kaks' tavallista Lahtista, which was entered into the 10th Berlin International Film Festival. In 1958 she won the Miss Finland beauty contest. In the early 1960s, Mannola had a successful career as a singer in Germany.

Personal life
Mannola was married to film director Åke Lindman from 1968 until his death in 2009. They had one daughter. She is of partial Russian descent.

Selected filmography
 Kaks' tavallista Lahtista (1960)
 Leikkikalugangsteri (1969)

References

External links

1938 births
Living people
People from Valkeakoski
Finnish film actresses
Miss Finland winners
Finnish female models
20th-century Finnish women singers
Finnish people of Russian descent